The 2002 BC Lions finished in third place in the West Division with a 10–8 record. After beginning the season with a 1–5 record, general manager Adam Rita fired head coach Steve Buratto and coached the team on an interim basis for the rest of the year. He guided the group to a 9–3 turnaround which led to an appearance in the West-Semi Final. Despite the turnaround, Rita was fired as general manager/coach after the playoff loss.

Offseason

CFL Draft

Preseason

Regular season

Season standings

Season schedule

Player stats

Passing

Rushing

Receiving

Awards and records
Jason Clermont, Outstanding Rookie

2002 CFL All-Stars

Brendan Ayanbadejo, Linebacker
Eric Carter, Cornerback
Barrin Simpson, Linebacker

Western Division All-Star Selections

Brendan Ayanbadejo, Linebacker
Eric Carter, Cornerback
Steve Hardin, Offensive Guard
Carl Kidd, Linebacker
Derick (Bo) Lewis, Defensive Back
Herman Smith, Defensive End
Barrin Simpson, Linebacker
Jamie Taras, Centre

Playoffs

West Semi-Final

References

BC Lions seasons
BC Lions
2002 in British Columbia